Kings Canyon Unified School District comprises mainly Reedley, California area schools, but also those for the town of Orange Cove and the mountain areas (Dunlap, Miramonte, Squaw Valley, Wonder Valley). The school district was established in 1965. The athletics are mainly for fun until they reach high school where most sports are highly competitive. The KCUSD headquarters is located near Reedley High School.

Schools
Here is a list of the schools that the KCUSD has to offer:

Elementary

Alta Elementary School
A.L. Conner Elementary School
Jefferson Elementary School
Great Western Elementary School
Washington Elementary School
McCord Elementary School
Lincoln Elementary School
Sheridan Elementary School

K-8 School

Dunlap K-8 School
Thomas Law Reed K-8 School
Riverview K-8 School
Silas Bartsch K-8 School

Middle School

General Grant Middle School
Navelencia Middle School
Citrus Middle School

High School

Reedley High School
Orange Cove High School
Dunlap Leadership Academy

Alternative Education

Kings Canyon High School
Mountain View Independent School

School Mascots

Elementary

Alta Elementary School EAGLES
A.L. Conner Elementary School COUGARS
Jefferson Elementary School JETS
Great Western Elementary School BRONCOS
Washington Elementary School WILDCATS
McCord Elementary School MUSTANGS
Lincoln Elementary School PANTHERS
Sheridan Elementary School BULLDOGS

K-8 School

Dunlap K-8 School BOBCATS
Thomas Law Reed K-8 School HUSKIES
Riverview K-8 School BEAVERS
Silas Bartsch K-8 School BENGALS

Middle School

General Grant Middle School GRIZZLIES
Navelencia Middle School PATRIOTS
Citrus Middle School VIKINGS

High School

Reedley High School PIRATES
Orange Cove High School TITANS
Dunlap Leadership Academy

Alternative Education

Kings Canyon High School WILDCATS
Mountain View Independent School

Sports

The athletics in middle school offer flag football and play against KCUSD K-8/Middle schools.
General Grant Middle School Grizzlies are the only middle school to offer tennis which means other schools have to play for the Grizzlies. They play against out-of-town middle schools.
Chess teams compete against KCUSD schools and in tournaments around California.
Reedley High School is the only non-Fresno area school to offer badminton as a competitive sport.
Reedley High School competes as a Div. II team and is in the County/Metro Athletic Conference (CMAC) league.
Orange Cove High School competes as a Div. VI team and has captured many Div. VI titles and a few runner-up titles.
Reedley High School has captured many Div. II titles and a few runner-up titles.

School districts in Fresno County, California
1965 establishments in California
School districts established in 1965